Polyporus gayanus is a species of fungus in the genus Polyporus. It was first documented in 1846 by French mycologist Joseph-Henri Léveillé.

References

External links
 
 

gayanus
Fungi described in 1846